The Arakkonam block is a revenue block in the Vellore district of Tamil Nadu, India. It has a total of 26 panchayat villages.

References 

 

Revenue blocks of Vellore district